Radio KOL may refer to:

 Radio KOL (Kids Online), a defunct internet radio station for children owned by AOL
 KKOL (AM), a radio station (1300 AM) licensed to Seattle, Washington, United States formerly known as KOL
 Radio Kol Chai, an Israeli radio station
 The Kingdom of Loathing role-playing game's SHOUTcast radio station